Than Tun (born 10 May 1941) is a Burmese boxer. He competed in the men's featherweight event at the 1960 Summer Olympics. At the 1960 Summer Olympics, in his lone bout he lost to William Meyers of South Africa by decision in the Round of 32.

References

External links
 

1941 births
Living people
Burmese male boxers
Olympic boxers of Myanmar
Boxers at the 1960 Summer Olympics
Sportspeople from Mandalay
Asian Games bronze medalists for Myanmar
Asian Games medalists in boxing
Boxers at the 1962 Asian Games
Medalists at the 1962 Asian Games
Featherweight boxers